Christophe Soglo (28 June 1909 – 7 October 1983) was a Beninese military officer and political leader.

Early life
Christophe Soglo was born on 28 June 1909 in Abomey, French Dahomey to a chiefly Fon family.

Military career 
In 1931 Soglo voluntarily enlisted in the French Army. He fought during World War II, serving in Morocco and participating in the Allies' landings in Corsica, Elba, and southern France. Promoted to the rank of lieutenant, at the end of the war he was made a staff officer for the French Colonial Army. In 1947 he was attached to the French Ministry of Overseas as a military advisor. Securing the rank of captain on 1 January 1950, he was sent to French Indochina and fought in First Indochina War. He was awarded the Croix de Guerre in 1956 for his service during the war. While there he met a French-Vietnamese woman whom he later married. Following France's defeat in Indochina he was given the rank of major and stationed in Senegal, where he remained until 1960. After Benin achieved independence in 1960, Soglo was given the rank of colonel in the army and became its chief of staff under President Hubert Maga.

Political career 
On October 28, 1963, Soglo took control of the country to prevent a civil war. Soglo had previously declared loyalty to Maga's government. He established a provisional government with himself as chairman after dissolving the national assembly. After reorganizing the government, he gave up power in January 1964 and allowed former premier Sourou-Migan Apithy to become president. Soon Apithy and other political leaders began massive feuds over policies. After repeatedly encouraging the various political forces to agree to dialogue, Soglo again overthrew the government in November 1965 and served as President of Benin under a military government until December 1967, when a group of younger army officers overthrew him. Soglo then retired from politics. He died on October 7, 1983, at the age of 74.

Citations

References
 
 .

1909 births
1983 deaths
People of French West Africa
Leaders who took power by coup
Leaders ousted by a coup
Beninese military personnel
People from Abomey
Recipients of the Croix de Guerre (France)
French military personnel of the First Indochina War
Free French military personnel of World War II
Military coups in Benin